Gary Middleton  (born 20 June 1990) is a Unionist politician from Northern Ireland representing the Democratic Unionist Party (DUP). He has been a member of the Northern Ireland Assembly (MLA) for Foyle since April 2015, when he was co-opted to replace Maurice Devenney.

He served as Acting Junior Minister for the Executive Office from February to March 2021 while Gordon Lyons was Acting Agriculture Minister while Edwin Poots stood aside due to ill health. In June 2021, Middleton replaced Lyons permanently as Junior Minister.

Early life
Born in Newbuildings, County Londonderry, Middleton studied Computer Science at the University of Ulster, and also obtained a diploma in Civic Leadership and Community Planning from the same institution. Prior to becoming an MLA, he was a youth worker and also worked as an assistant to Foyle MLA William Hay and later Maurice Devenney, who was himself co-opted to replace William Hay in October 2014 upon the latter's retirement after being elevated to the House of Lords.

Electoral history
Middleton was first elected to Derry City Council in 2011 at the age of 20, replacing William Hay by co-option. He also served as Deputy Mayor from June 2013 – March 2015.

In 2014 he was elected to the new Derry and Strabane 'super council' and was appointed group leader of the DUP councillors. In April 2015, he was co-opted to replace fellow DUP member Maurice Devenney in the Northern Ireland Assembly, becoming the assembly's youngest member at 24.

Shortly after joining the assembly, it was announced that Middleton would be the DUP's candidate for the Foyle constituency in the United Kingdom general election, eventually finishing a distant third with 12.4% of the vote.

References

External links
DUP profile
NI Assembly profile

1990 births
Living people
Democratic Unionist Party MLAs
Councillors in Derry (city)
Northern Ireland MLAs 2011–2016
Northern Ireland MLAs 2016–2017
Northern Ireland MLAs 2017–2022
People from County Londonderry